The 1903 Philadelphia Phillies season was a season in American baseball. The team finished seventh in the National League with a record of 49–86,  games behind the Pittsburgh Pirates.

Offseason 
James Potter and his syndicate of investors completed their acquisition of the Phillies, the "Philadelphia Base Ball Club", from Colonel John I. Rogers on April 3, 1903. Potter and his partners acquired the Phillies for $117,000.

Preseason 
The Phillies held spring training in 1903 in Richmond, Virginia where the team practiced and played exhibition games at Broad Street Park. It was the lone season the Phillies trained in Richmond.

1903 Philadelphia City Series

The Philadelphia Athletics began play in 1901 with the founding of the American League. National League and American League teams did not play each other in 1901 or 1902 as the two leagues warred over markets and customers. 

The two leagues made peace after 1902 and the Phillies and Athletics scheduled a preseason series for the local championship. The Phillies had last played for the city championship against the Player League’s Philadelphia Athletics in 1890. The Philadelphia Inquirer noted, "For the first time in thirteen years two local teams, representing rival base ball organizations, will come together in a friendly struggle for supremacy of the Quaker City." The Athletics had won the 1902 American League pennant, the Phillies had been newly acquired by John Rogers in February 1903, and interest was high. 

The Phillies and Athletics played five of nine scheduled games; the Phillies defeated the Athletics, 4 games to 1.

The series was scheduled to begin on April 4, 1903 at the Phillies’ Philadelphia Ball Park but was called off due to rain. Games scheduled for April 7, 1903 at the Phillies’ park and April 8, 1903 at the Athletics’ Columbia Park were also canceled due to rain and wet grounds, along with the final scheduled game of the series on April 14, 1903 at the Phillies’ park.

Regular season 
On August 8, 1903, a balcony collapsed at Baker Bowl during a game against Boston. The New York Times reported the following day that four were killed and 125 injured. The Phillies temporarily called Columbia Park home while Baker Bowl was repaired. They played sixteen games at Columbia Park in August and September 1903.

On September 18, 1903, Chick Fraser pitched a no-hitter in the second game of a double header against the Chicago Cubs at West Side Park. Fraser walked five batters, the Phillies committed four errors and won 10 to 0.

Season standings

Record vs. opponents

Notable transactions 
 April 1903: Pop Williams was purchased by the Phillies from the Chicago Orphans.
 July 1903: Pop Williams was released by the Phillies.

Roster

Postseason

1903 Philadelphia City Series (Fall)

The Phillies and Athletics played a postseason series for the local championship in addition to the preseason series played in April. The teams played seven of ten games scheduled; games scheduled for October 8, 1903; October 9, 1903; and October 10, 1903 were canceled due to rain. The Athletics won the series, 4 games to 3.

All of the series games were played at the Athletics’ Columbia Park with each team alternating as the home team. The Phillies’ Philadelphia Ball Park’s had collapsed on August 8 1903 leaving four dead, and closing the ballpark for the balance of the season.

After the 1903 season, the Phillies had won 7 and the Athletics had won 5 of the 12 total games played in the city series.

Player stats

Batting

Starters by position 
Note: Pos = Position; G = Games played; AB = At bats; H = Hits; Avg. = Batting average; HR = Home runs; RBI = Runs batted in

Other batters 
Note: G = Games played; AB = At bats; H = Hits; Avg. = Batting average; HR = Home runs; RBI = Runs batted in

Pitching

Starting pitchers 
Note: G = Games pitched; IP = Innings pitched; W = Wins; L = Losses; ERA = Earned run average; SO = Strikeouts

Other pitchers 
Note: G = Games pitched; IP = Innings pitched; W = Wins; L = Losses; ERA = Earned run average; SO = Strikeouts

Notes

References 
1903 Philadelphia Phillies season at Baseball Reference

Philadelphia Phillies seasons
Philadelphia Phillies season
Philly